Daliao District is a suburban district in Kaohsiung City, Taiwan. Part of the Kaohsiung metropolitan area, it has 111,575 inhabitants as of January 2023, making it the 9th most populous district of Kaohsiung. It has a area of 71.04 square kilometers, or 27.4287 square miles, giving it a population density of 1,569 people per square kilometer, or 4,064 people per square mile. It is linked with Downtown Kaohsiung by the Orange Line of the Kaohsiung Metro.

History
Daliao is reported to be the origin of the surname Changchien (張簡), the most common two syllable surname in Taiwan.

After the handover of Taiwan from Japan to the Republic of China in 1945, Daliao was organized as a rural township of Kaohsiung County. On 25 December 2010, Kaohsiung County was merged with Kaohsiung City and Daliao was upgraded to a district of the city.

Administrative divisions
The district consists of Kaotan, Neikeng, Daliao, Shangliao, Sanlong, Liuqiu, Wengyuan, Qianzhuang, Zhongzhuang, Houzhuang, Yiren, Xincuo, Guoxi, Chaoliao, Guijie, Guishe, Shanding, Zhongyi, Yongfang, Yihe, Xiliao, Jiangshan, Zhaoming, Guangwu and Zhongxing Village.

Education

Higher education
 Fooyin University
 Fortune Institute of Technology

Vocational schools
 Chung Shan Industrial and Commercial School
 Kaohsiung Gaoying Private Vocational School (高雄市私立高英高級工商職業學校)

Senior high schools
 Kaohsiung Xinguang Private Senior High School (高雄市私立新光高級中學)

Junior high schools
 Kaohsiung Municipal Da Laotian Junior High School (高雄市立大寮國民中學)
 Kaohsiung Municipal Chao Laotian Junior High School (高雄市立潮寮國民中學)
 Kaohsiung Municipal Zhongzhuang Junior High School (高雄市立中庄國民中學)

Primary schools
 Kaohsiung Municipal Daliao District Yongfang Primary School (高雄市大寮區永芳國民小學)
 Kaohsiung Municipal Daliao District Da Laotian Primary School (高雄市大寮區大寮國民小學)
 Kaohsiung Municipal Daliao District Zhongyi Primary School (高雄市大寮區忠義國民小學)
 Kaohsiung Municipal Daliao District Wengyuan Primary School (高雄市大寮區翁園國民小學)
 Kaohsiung Municipal Daliao District Zhongzhuang Primary School (高雄市大寮區中庄國民小學)
 Kaohsiung Municipal Daliao District Xi Laotian Primary School (高雄市大寮區溪寮國民小學)
 Kaohsiung Municipal Daliao District Zhaoming Primary School (高雄市大寮區昭明國民小學)
 Kaohsiung Municipal Daliao District Chao Laotian Primary School (高雄市大寮區潮寮國民小學)
 Kaohsiung Municipal Daliao District Shanding Primary School (高雄市大寮區山頂國民小學)
 Kaohsiung Municipal Daliao District Houzhuang Primary School (高雄市大寮區後庄國民小學)

Tourist attractions
 Adzuki Bean and Fruit Journey
 Baofu Temple (保福宮), founded in 1841
 Caogong Canal Tide Gate
 Chaozhong Temple (朝中宮), founded in 1768
 Gaoping River Embankment
 Jhang Jian and Jian's Family Ancestral Shrine
 Jhuanzaiyao
 Jhuzaijiao House
 Kaifeng Temple (大發開封宮)
 Kaotan Old Banyan Tree
 Laogu Stone house
 Liouciou Old Banyan Tree
 Nansyong Daitian Temple (南雄代天府)
 Ruins of the Sugar Industry
 Shanzaiding Chen's Residence
 Sigong House
 Stone God
 Wongyuan Pimping Station

Transportation

 KMRT Daliao Station
 TRA Houzhuang Station
 Provincial Highways 1, 1F, 25, 29, and 88

Notable natives
 Lung Ying-tai, Minister of Culture (2012-2014)

References

External links

 

Districts of Kaohsiung